Mastax carissima is a species of beetle in the family Carabidae found in Myanmar.

References

Mastax carissima
Beetles of Asia
Beetles described in 1892